Teenage Angst is a 1996 song by the band Placebo

It may also refer to:

 Teenage angst, an intense feeling of fear or anxiety, in this case by teenagers
 "Teenage Angst", a song on the album Beige by The Arrogant Worms